The following railroads operate in the U.S. state of North Carolina.

Common freight carriers
Aberdeen, Carolina and Western Railway (ACWR)
Aberdeen and Rockfish Railroad (AR)
Alexander Railroad (ARC)
Atlantic and Western Railway (ATW)
Blue Ridge Southern Railroad (BLU)
Caldwell County Railroad (CWCY)
Cape Fear Railways (CF)
Carolina Coastal Railway (CLNA)
(Operates the Nash County Railroad)
Chesapeake and Albemarle Railroad (CA)
Clinton Terminal Railroad (CTR)
CSX Transportation (CSXT)
Great Smoky Mountains Railroad (GSM)
High Point, Thomasville and Denton Railroad (HPTD)
Kinston and Snow Hill Railroad (KSH)
Laurinburg and Southern Railroad (LRS)
Norfolk Southern Railway (NS) including subsidiaries Camp Lejeune Railroad (CPLJ) and State University Railroad (SUR)
(Operates the North Carolina Railroad) (NCRR)
North Carolina and Virginia Railroad (NCVA)
R.J. Corman Carolina Lines (RJCS)
Thermal Belt Railway (TBRY)
Virginia Southern Railroad (VSRR)
Wilmington Terminal Railroad (WTRY)
Winston-Salem Southbound Railway (WSS)
Yadkin Valley Railroad (YVRR)

Passenger carriers

Amtrak (AMTK)
Charlotte Trolley
Great Smoky Mountains Railroad
New Hope Valley Railway
Lynx Blue Line
Red Springs & Northern Railroad
Tweetsie Railroad

Defunct railroads

Electric railways
Asheville and East Tennessee Railroad
Asheville Electric Company
Asheville Loop Line Railway
Asheville Street Railway
Carolina Power and Light Company
Charlotte Electric Railway, Light and Power Company
Cumberland Railway and Power Company
Durham Traction Company
Fayetteville Street Railway
Fries Manufacturing and Power Company
North Carolina Public Service Company
Piedmont and Northern Railway (P&N)
Piedmont Traction Company
Salisbury and Spencer Railway
Tidewater Power Company
Wilmington Sea Coast Railroad

Private carriers
Blackwood Lumber Company
Butters Lumber Company
Experimental Railroad
Whiteville Lumber Company

Not completed
Cincinnati and Charleston Railroad
Louisville, Cincinnati and Charleston Railroad

Notes

References
Association of American Railroads (2003), Railroad Service in North Carolina (PDF). Retrieved May 11, 2005.

North Carolina
 
 
Railroads